The U.S. Open Pickleball Championships is an annual pickleball tournament that has been held since 2016 at the East Naples Community Park in Naples, Florida. Its sixth and most recent event in 2022 featured 35,000 attendees and 3,000 players competing over the course of seven days. The competition consists of five pro-level championships: men's and women's singles, men's and women's doubles, and mixed doubles. Other non-professional tournaments at the event are categorized by age and/or skill level with participants chosen based on a lottery system. It is considered the largest event for the sport of pickleball.
 
The U.S. Open Pickleball Championships were founded by Terri Graham and Chris Evon through their sports development firm, Spirit Promotions. The first event was held in 2016 with around 800 participants and 2,000 spectators. Since the tournament's inception, portions of it have been televised by CBS Sports Network, typically on tape delay. The men's and women's doubles championships have been broadcast live by the network for both the 2021 and 2022 editions. The event's current sponsors include Minto and Margaritaville.

References

External links
Official website

Pickleball organizations
2016 establishments in Florida
Annual sporting events in the United States
Sports in Naples, Florida
Recurring sporting events established in 2016